Jonathan Torres, also known as "JT" Torres, is a Puerto Rican American Brazilian Jiu-Jitsu practitioner and submission grappler. He is known for a number of competitive accomplishments earned both prior to and following his promotion to black belt.

Though having won numerous victories in gi competition, Torres has been particularly successful in no-gi events, earning multiple international championships.

In March 2013, Torres left Team Lloyd Irvin and joined Atos Jiu-Jitsu.

On November 22, 2014, Torres fought Rory MacDonald in a grappling match in Metamoris V. Giving up 40 pounds, the fight ended in a draw.

Torres was booked to compete against Magid Hage at Who's Number One on February 25, 2023. He won the match by unanimous decision.

References

American practitioners of Brazilian jiu-jitsu
Living people
People awarded a black belt in Brazilian jiu-jitsu
1989 births
World No-Gi Brazilian Jiu-Jitsu Championship medalists